Azhar Abbas is a senior Pakistani journalist and the current managing director of Geo News.

Personal life
Abbas's father was Mirza Abid Abbas, an educationist who was the former secretary of the Hyderabad Board of Education; he died in 2002. Abbas has four brothers, retired Major General Athar Abbas, Zaffar Abbas, Anwer Abbas, and Mazhar Abbas.

In 2008 Abbas's brother, Athar Abbas, became the Director General of the ISPR. He served until 2012 and was Pakistan's Ambassador to Ukraine from 2015 to 2018. His other brother Mazhar Abbas is the secretary general of the Pakistan Federal Union of Journalists, while another brother, Zaffar Abbas, is the editor of Dawn (newspaper). He has another brother named Anwer Abbas.

He is married and has a daughter and a son.

Journalism career
He has been involved in mainstream journalism since 1990. He started his career with an English-language daily newspaper as a reporter. He had completed his master's degree in economics from the University of Karachi in 1990.  He is a recipient of a Fulbright Scholarship program and studied at Boston University and Newhouse School of Communication. He has also worked for Dawn News as the director of news and current affairs. He joined Bol News when the network was established but left after the Axact scandal. He is a strong supporter of the journalistic community in Pakistan and an advocate for their well-being.

Awards and recognition
 Azhar Abbas (journalist) was awarded the Hilal-i-Imtiaz (Crescent of Excellence) in 2013 by the President of Pakistan.

References

External links
 Azhar abbas Musharaf take over
 The Murrow Interview - Media Wars: Journalists, Generals and Jihadis

Pakistani male journalists
Living people
Boston University alumni
Recipients of Hilal-i-Imtiaz
Year of birth missing (living people)
S.I. Newhouse School of Public Communications alumni